The school is closed down!
 
The International School of Southern Denmark (The Cosmo) is a private international school located in Kolding, Denmark. The school follows the University of Cambridge International Examinations (CIE) curriculum. The school is supported financially by the Municipality of Kolding and multiple local businesses.

History
The International School of Southern Denmark was founded in 2008 on the initiative of Kolding Municipality and Kolding Realskole. Kolding Realskole is a Danish language private school which has been operating in Kolding since 1890.

In order to assist in attracting foreign workers and investors Kolding Municipality felt it necessary to establish an international school within the region. Kolding Municipality partnered with Kolding Realskole to make that desire come true. In 2008, Kolding received approval by Cambridge International Examinations (CIE) to open a Cambridge certified school in Kolding.

Curriculum
The curriculum is based on the British educational system (National Curriculum), specifically the Cambridge International Examinations (CIE) qualifications. The school offers 3 Cambridge certified programs (CIE) for students between the ages of 5 and 16.

 Cambridge International Primary Programme (CIPP) – Years 1 -6
 Cambridge Lower Secondary Programme (CLSP) - Years 7 - 9
 International General Certificate of Secondary Education (IGCSE) - Years 10 and 11

CIE qualifications are recognised for admission by UK universities (including Cambridge), as well as universities in the United States, Canada, European Union, Middle East, West Asia, New Zealand, Pakistan, Sri Lanka and around the world.

The School
The school has a capacity of 150 students. During the 2010-2011 school year, the Cosmo had students from 20 different countries around the world. The school is located in downtown Kolding, which is located at the head of Kolding Fjord, in the Southern region of Jutland. The school is easily accessible by train or bus. Students who attend the school live in the entire region of southern Denmark, including Fredericia, Horsens, Middelfart, Vejle and Billund.

School Building
 The main school building is housed inside Sct. Joergens Gaard, which is an old hospital which was first charter by King Christian III of Denmark in 1558. The building has undergone many renovations and additions over the years. In 1917, the building underwent a large expansion and from that time Sct. Joergens Gaard served as a hospital and retirement home until its closure in 1975. At which time Kolding Municipality took the opportunity to give the building a thorough renovation. Finally, in 2008 it was determined that Sct. Joergens Gaard would be the location of Kolding’s new international school.

The Cosmo moved location from Sct. Joergens Gaard back to the grounds of Realskolen Kolding. At this location the school will have good facilities. The Classrooms are in mint condition and there is a lot of space for the children to have fun on the big playground.

Awards
In 2008, the Cosmo was awarded the ‘Innozone prize’ for the best initiative of the year in the Triangle Region (Kolding, Vejle, Fredericia).

References

External links

School Website

Schools in Denmark
Cambridge schools in Denmark
International schools in Denmark
Educational institutions established in 2008
2008 establishments in Denmark